Farmer is an unincorporated community in Pike County, in the U.S. state of Missouri.

History
Farmer was platted in 1885, and taking its name from Moses Allen Farmer, an early settler.  A post office called Farmer was established in 1883, and remained in operation until 1906.

References

Unincorporated communities in Pike County, Missouri
Unincorporated communities in Missouri